Megaloxantha bicolor is a species of metallic wood-boring beetles in the family Buprestidae.

Description
The basic colour of these beetles is  usually metallic green, but may be  blue, reddish or blackish, with two basal and postmedian large yellow or whitish bands. The pronotal sides are usually bright orange-yellow.

Distribution
This species can be found from India to Vietnam, Australia and the Philippines.

Subspecies
 Megaloxantha bicolor arcuatifasciata Kurosawa, 1978
 Megaloxantha bicolor bicolor (Fabricius, 1778)
 Megaloxantha bicolor brunnea (Saunders, 1866)
 Megaloxantha bicolor gigantea (Schaller, 1783) (India)
 Megaloxantha bicolor hainana Kurosawa, 1991
 Megaloxantha bicolor luodiana Yang & Xie, 1993
 Megaloxantha bicolor matsudai Endo, 1992 (Indonesia)
 Megaloxantha bicolor nigricornis  (Deyrolle, 1864) (Malaysia)
 Megaloxantha bicolor nishiyamai Endo, 1992 (Philippines)
 Megaloxantha bicolor ohtanii Kurosawa, 1991 (Indonesia, Vietnam)
 Megaloxantha bicolor palawanica Kurosawa, 1978 (Philippines)
 Megaloxantha bicolor porphyreus Hou & Wu, 1996 (Vietnam)
 Megaloxantha bicolor sakaii Kurosawa, 1991

Gallery

References
 Biolib

External links
  World Field Guide

Buprestidae
Beetles described in 1775
Taxa named by Johan Christian Fabricius